Anna Seaton Huntington (born February 12, 1964) is an American rower and author. She competed in the women's eight oared shell in the 1988 Olympics and won a bronze medal in the coxless pair in 1992 at the Barcelona Games. She also won five World Championship silver medals during her six-year career on the U.S. National Rowing Team.

In 1995 she was a member of the first all women's team to vie for the America's Cup sailing trophy. Seaton Huntington wrote a book about that campaign called, "Making Waves: The Inside Story of Managing and Motivating the First Women's Team to Compete for the America's Cup."

She has been inducted into the Harvard University sports Hall of Fame, the Kansas Sports Hall of Fame, and the National Rowing Foundation's Hall of Fame.

Huntington graduated from Harvard in 1986 and received a M.S. from Columbia University in 1996.

References

External links 
 
 

1964 births
Living people
American female rowers
Sportspeople from Topeka, Kansas
Rowers at the 1988 Summer Olympics
Rowers at the 1992 Summer Olympics
Olympic bronze medalists for the United States in rowing
Harvard University alumni
Medalists at the 1992 Summer Olympics
World Rowing Championships medalists for the United States
Columbia University alumni
21st-century American women